Goodenia tenuiloba is a species of flowering plant in the family Goodeniaceae and is endemic to the north-west of Western Australia. It is an erect to ascending herb with linear to oblong leaves at the base of the plant and racemes of yellow flowers.

Description
Flowering mainly occurs from May to September.

Taxonomy and naming
Goodenia tenuiloba was first formally described in 1885 by Ferdinand von Mueller in the journal Southern Science Record from specimens collected "in the vicinity of Mt. Hale (C. Crossland)". The specific epithet (tenuiloba) means "thin-lobed".

Distribution
This goodenia grows in scrub mainly in the Pilbara region.

Conservation status
Goodenia tenuiloba is classified as "not threatened" by the Government of Western Australia Department of Parks and Wildlife.

References

tenuiloba
Eudicots of Western Australia
Taxa named by Ferdinand von Mueller
Plants described in 1885